The Flammarion engraving is a wood engraving by an unknown artist, so named because its first documented appearance is in Camille Flammarion's 1888 book  ("The Atmosphere: Popular Meteorology"). The wood engraving has often, but erroneously, been referred to as a woodcut. It has been used as a metaphorical illustration of either the scientific or the mystical quests for knowledge.

Description
The print depicts a man, clothed in a long robe and carrying a staff, who is at the edge of the Earth, where it meets the sky. He kneels down and passes his head, shoulders, and right arm through the star-studded sky, discovering a marvellous realm of circling clouds, fires and suns beyond the heavens. One of the elements of the cosmic machinery bears a strong resemblance to traditional pictorial representations of the "wheel in the middle of a wheel" described in the visions of the Hebrew prophet Ezekiel. The caption that accompanies the engraving in Flammarion's book reads:

Attribution 
In 1957, astronomer Ernst Zinner claimed that the image dated to the German Renaissance, but he was unable to find any version published earlier than 1906. Further investigation, however, revealed that the work was a composite of images characteristic of different historical periods, and that it had been made with a burin, a tool used for wood engraving only since the late 18th century. The image was traced to Flammarion's book by Arthur Beer, an astrophysicist and historian of German science at Cambridge and, independently, by Bruno Weber, the curator of rare books at the Zürich central library.

Flammarion had been apprenticed at the age of twelve to an engraver in Paris and it is believed that many of the illustrations for his books were engraved from his own drawings, probably under his supervision. Therefore, it is plausible that Flammarion himself created the image, though the evidence for this remains inconclusive. Like most other illustrations in Flammarion's books, the engraving carries no attribution. Although sometimes referred to as a forgery or a hoax, Flammarion does not characterize the engraving as a medieval or renaissance woodcut, and the mistaken interpretation of the engraving as an older work did not occur until after Flammarion's death. The decorative border surrounding the engraving is distinctly non-medieval and it was only by cropping it that the confusion about the historical origins of the image became possible.

According to Bruno Weber and to astronomer Joseph Ashbrook, the depiction of a spherical heavenly vault separating the Earth from an outer realm is similar to the first illustration in Sebastian Münster's Cosmographia of 1544, a book which Flammarion, an ardent bibliophile and book collector, might have owned.

Context in Flammarion's book 
In Flammarion's L'atmosphère: météorologie populaire, the image refers to the text on the facing page (p. 162), which also clarifies the author's intent in using it as an illustration:

The same paragraph had already appeared, without the accompanying engraving, in an earlier edition of the text published under the title of L'atmosphère: description des grands phénomènes de la Nature ("The Atmosphere: Description of the Great Phenomena of Nature," 1872). The correspondence between the text and the illustration is so close that one would appear to be based on the other. Had Flammarion known of the engraving in 1872, it seems unlikely that he would have left it out of that year's edition, which was already heavily illustrated. The more probable conclusion therefore is that Flammarion commissioned the engraving specifically to illustrate this particular text, though this has not been ascertained conclusively.

Literary sources

The idea of the contact of a solid sky with the Earth is one that repeatedly appears in Flammarion's earlier works. In his Les mondes imaginaires et les mondes réels ("Imaginary Worlds and Real Worlds", 1864), he cites a legend of a Christian saint, Macarius the Roman, which he dates to the 6th century. This legend includes the story of three monks (Theophilus, Sergius, and Hyginus) who "wished to discover the point where the sky and the earth touch" (in Latin: ubi cœlum terræ se conjungit). After recounting the legend he remarks that "the preceding monks hoped to go to heaven without leaving the earth, to find 'the place where the sky and the earth touch,' and open the mysterious gateway which separates this world from the other. Such is the cosmographical notion of the universe; it is always the terrestrial valley crowned by the canopy of the heavens."

In the legend of St. Macarius, the monks do not in fact find the place where Earth and sky touch. In Les mondes imaginaires Flammarion recounts another story:

Flammarion also mentioned the same story, in nearly the same words, in his Histoire du Ciel ("History of the Sky"):

The Letters referred to are a series of short essays by François de La Mothe Le Vayer. In letter 89, Le Vayer, after mentioning Strabo's scornful opinion of Pytheas's account of a region in the far north where land, sea, and air seemed to mingle in a single gelatinous substance, adds:

Le Vayer does not specify who this "anchorite" was, nor does he provide further details about the story or its sources. Le Vayer's comment was expanded upon by Pierre Estève in his Histoire generale et particuliere de l'astronomie ("General and Particular History of Astronomy," 1755), where he interprets Le Vayer's statement (without attribution) as a claim that Pytheas "had arrived at a corner of the sky, and was obliged to stoop down in order not to touch it."

The combination of the story of St. Macarius with Le Vayer's remarks seems to be due to Flammarion himself. It also appears in his Les terres du ciel ("The Lands of the Sky"):

Later uses and interpretations 
The Flammarion engraving appeared in C. G. Jung's Flying Saucers: A Modern Myth of Things Seen in the Skies (1959). The first color version to be published was made by Roberta Weir and distributed by Berkeley's Print Mint in 1970. That color image spawned most of the modern variations that have followed since. Donovan's 1973 LP, Cosmic Wheels, used an extended black and white version on its inner sleeve (an artist added elements extending the image to fit the proportions of the record jacket). The image also appeared in "The Compleat Astrologer" (pg. 25) by Derek and Julia Parker in 1971. In 1994, 'The Secret Language of Birthdays' by Gary Goldschneider and Joost Elffers was published featuring this image.

The Flammarion engraving appeared on the cover of Daniel J. Boorstin's bestselling history of science The Discoverers, published in 1983. Other books devoted to science that used it as an illustration include The Mathematical Experience (1981) by Philip J. Davis and Reuben Hersh, Matter, Space, and Motion: Theories in Antiquity and Their Sequel (1988) by Richard Sorabji, Paradoxes of Free Will (2002) by Gunther Stent, and Uncentering the Earth: Copernicus and On the Revolutions of the Heavenly Spheres (2006) by William T. Vollmann. Some books devoted to mysticism which have also used the engraving include Love and Law (2001) by Ernest Holmes and Gnosticism: New Light on the Ancient Tradition of Inner Knowing (2002) by Stephan A. Hoeller.

The image was reproduced on the title page of the score of Brian Ferneyhough's "Transit: Six Solo Voices and Chamber Orchestra", published by Edition Peters in 1975.

British artist David Oxtoby made a drawing inspired by the Flammarion engraving (Spiritual Pilgrim), showing the face of David Bowie near drawing's right margin where the Sun should be. David Oxtoby's drawing doesn't show the crawling man at left.

An interpretation of the image was used for the animated sequence about the cosmological vision of Giordano Bruno in the March 9, 2014 premiere of the TV series Cosmos: A Spacetime Odyssey, hosted by the astrophysicist Neil deGrasse Tyson.

More recently in May 2021, an interpretation of the image has featured on a limited edition book release by Yusuf/Cat Stevens.

In the German-language video series "Von Aristoteles zur Stringtheorie", ("From Aristotle to String Theory"), which is hosted on YouTube and produced by Urknall, Weltall, und das Leben, and features Professor Joseph Gaßner as lecturer, a colored Flammarion engraving was selected as a logo, but the man is peering at a background filled with the important equations of physics.

Niklas Åkerblad also known as El Huervo, in October 2021 released an album titled "Flammarion" in which the cover art for the album depicts an interpretation of the original Flammarion engraving.

Some commentators have claimed that Flammarion produced the image to propagandize the myth that medieval Europeans widely believed the Earth to be flat. In his book, however, Flammarion never discusses the history of beliefs about the shape of the Earth. His text suggests that the image is simply a fanciful illustration of the false view of the sky as an opaque barrier.

See also

Biblical cosmology
Empyrean
Firmament
Celestial spheres
Primum Mobile
The Truman Show

References

External links
 Georg Peez: "Zum Beispiel; Anonymer und undatierter Holzschnitt" . 

1880s works
19th-century prints
Works of unknown authorship
Sun in art
Moon in art